Prithvi Chand Kisku  was an Indian politician. He was a member of parliament, representing Dumka in the Lok Sabha the lower house of India's Parliament as a member of the Indian National Congress.

References

External links
Official biographical sketch in Parliament of India website

Lok Sabha members from Bihar
Indian National Congress politicians
India MPs 1984–1989
1927 births
2011 deaths